Ten: The Hits Tour (also known as The Ten Tour) was the sixth and final concert tour by British-Irish girl group Girls Aloud in support of the greatest hits album Ten (2012). It was the group's first tour in four years, following a three-year hiatus. The tour ranked on Pollstar's annual "Top 100 Mid Year Worldwide Tours". It earned £7.8m ($13.5m) from 20 shows.

Background 
Following their Out of Control Tour in 2009, Girls Aloud announced they would take a year-long hiatus before returning for a new album in 2010. The plans never came to be. On 19 October 2012, they held a press conference where they announced their reunion and their plans to release a "greatest hits" album, Ten, in November, followed by a tour in early 2013. The tour's first fourteen dates in the United Kingdom and Ireland were announced the same day. Due to popular demand, extra dates were added in London, Birmingham, Newcastle, Glasgow, Manchester, Belfast and Dublin.

Critical reception 
Kate Mossman of The Guardian wrote "Girls Aloud are still a formidable pop engine – 10 legs and a beat – with a natural sense of economy, which extends to their emotions on stage. Maybe if the farewells – such as they are – come from the less powerful members then they might be easier to go back on." Joanne Dorken said in her review for MTV "Girls Aloud's tour had it all – tears and emotions, mixed with glitter and sparkle, proving that these girls are definitely the leaders of the pack and know how to put on an impressive show." Diane Bourne wrote for the Manchester Evening News "Sadly, by the end, with group hugs and teary eyes from the girls, you get the sense that this tenth anniversary tour is a farewell, rather than a comeback. But with such palpable love from this audience, you certainly wouldn't bet against their return again. Just don't wait another ten girls..." Simon Gallagher from WhatCulture! wrote "If this is indeed the end, and the tearful goodbyes (especially from hometown girl Cheryl [Cole]) would suggest so, the world of pop will be missing one of its crown jewels. And while there are now some new girl groups on the block, there are very few out there, whether "manufactured" or otherwise, who can match Girls Aloud for their performance or the staging of their tours." Andre Paine wrote for The Evening Standard "Crucially, they also liked their fans and got up close to the crowd after being transported to the middle of the venue for a sequence including the bracing electropop tune "Call the Shots". "The Promise" was a rousing finale to a celebration of their first 10 years — a lifetime in pop, yet Girls Aloud looked like a group in their prime and hungry for hits."

Broadcast and recordings 
The shows in London on 1 and 2 March 2013 were recorded for a DVD release. It was broadcast on MTV freeview channel Viva on Saturday 30 March 2013. The show was then repeated on MTV Music and MTV Live HD the following day. The broadcast omitted two songs, "Call Me Maybe" and "Beautiful 'Cause You Love Me". A DVD titled Ten – The Hits Tour featuring the full-length show except "Call Me Maybe" was released on 11 November 2013.

Set list 

Section 1
 "Sound of the Underground"
 "No Good Advice"
 "Life Got Cold"
 "Wake Me Up"
 "Jump"
Section 2
 "The Show" (Contains elements of "Models")
 "Love Machine"
 "Whole Lotta History"
 "Can't Speak French"
 "Biology"
Section 3
  "Sexy! No No No..."
  "Untouchable"
  "On the Metro"
  "Call the Shots"
Section 4
  "Something Kinda Ooooh"
  "Call Me Maybe" (Carly Rae Jepsen cover)
  "Beautiful 'Cause You Love Me"
  "Something New"
Encore
  "I'll Stand by You"
  "The Promise"

Source:

Tour dates 

Cancellations and rescheduled shows

Notes 
 Data from study is collected from all worldwide concerts held between 1 January and 30 June 2012. All monetary figures are based in U.S. dollars. All information is based upon extensive research conducted by Pollstar.

References 

Girls Aloud concert tours
2013 concert tours
2013 in British music
2013 video albums
February 2013 events in Europe
Concert tours of the United Kingdom
Concert tours of Ireland
March 2013 events in Europe